Nini Wacera (born 16 January 1978) is a Kenyan actress and casting director. Wacera has appeared in more than a dozen films and television series. She is notable for her role in the 2005 soap opera, Wingu la moto.

Career
In 2003, Nini played in Kenyan soap opera Wingu la moto as the main antagonist. The role earned her several accolades. She subsequently starred in films such as Project Daddy, The White Masai and Nairobi Half Life. In 2015, she was cast as one of the protagonists in the African version of the hit series Desperate Housewives .

Filmography

Awards and recognition

References

External links

1978 births
Kenyan film actresses
Kenyan film directors
Kenyan television actresses
Kenyan women film directors
Living people
21st-century Kenyan actresses